Formosa is a 2005 feature comedy directed by Noah Kadner, written by Jamieson Stern, and Produced by Anita M. Cal.  The movie starred Geoffrey Lewis and Steven Gilborn.  It was filmed in Albuquerque, New Mexico and was distributed internationally on cable. It won the Jury Award for Best Movie at the 2005 Garden State Film Festival and was feature at the Sedona Film Festival in Arizona.

Plot summary
Albuquerque, New Mexico, 1951. Sid Silver (Steven Gilborn) has a problem: his social guidance films aren't working anymore. The teens of the '50s are going crazy buck wild and Sid can no longer reach them. Clay Crawford (Jamieson Stern) also has a problem. He's on the run from the law and trying to make it to California to find a man who may be his father. A grizzled bounty hunter named Lucky (Geoffrey Lewis) is hot on Clay's trail. Sid and Clay cross paths in the hot desert winds of New Mexico. Sid's daughter Anne-Marie (Jessica Kiper) begins to fall for Clay to the dismay of her fiancé, Ted (Clayton Rohner) who also bankrolls Sid's films. The fates of Formosa Studios and perhaps New Mexico itself hang in the balance.

Cast 

Geoffrey Lewis
Jamieson Stern
Jessica Kiper
Steven Gilborn
Clayton Rohner
Cameron Bender
Richard Keith
Saginaw Grant
Erik Holland
Tara Nulty
Laura Nelson (Woodbury)

External links
Official Site

2005 films
2005 comedy films